Wipfra may refer to:

Wipfra, Wipfratal, a district of the municipality Wipfratal in Thuringia, Germany
Wipfra (river), a river of Thuringia, Germany